Sally Jane Dynevor  (née Whittaker; born 30 May 1963) is a British actress, she is best known for her role as Sally Metcalfe in the ITV soap opera Coronation Street, which she has played since 1986. In 2022, Dynevor competed in the fourteenth series of Dancing on Ice.

Early life
Dynevor was born in Middleton, Greater Manchester, to Robert and Jennifer Whittaker.

Career
Dynevor trained at Oldham Repertory Theatre and then the Mountview Academy of Theatre Arts. In 1985 she appeared in an episode of the television series Juliet Bravo, playing Wendy Cunningham, a troubled schoolgirl who becomes a heroin addict.

She has made a career out of playing Sally Webster (née Seddon), a bad girl turned tame, on the ITV soap opera Coronation Street. She made her début on the serial in January 1986 and has been with the programme ever since. Dynevor was nominated for Best TV soap Personality at the 2011 Television and Radio Industries Club Awards (TRIC Awards). She also, along with three co-stars, accepted the award for Best Storyline at the 2011 British Soap Awards which revolved around the Dobbs-Websters love triangle (this award is credited to producer, Phil Collinson). At the 2015 British Soap awards, she was nominated for Best On-Screen Partnership (with Joe Duttine), and won the award for Best Comedy Performance. In 2016, Dynevor and Joe Duttine won the award for Best On-Screen Partnership at the British Soap Awards. In October 2021, it was announced that Dynevor would be competing in the fourteenth series of Dancing on Ice.

Personal life
Dynevor married scriptwriter Tim Dynevor, in Trafford, Greater Manchester in 1995. They have three children including daughter Phoebe, all of whom were born in Trafford.

In November 2009, Dynevor was diagnosed with breast cancer the same year her character was, for which she has had chemotherapy and radiotherapy. Dynevor returned to the ITV soap in July 2010 after a six-month break. Both the actor and character went on to make full recoveries.

Since 1999, Dynevor has been an ambassador for the charity ActionAid. She has travelled to India to raise awareness of the organisation and represented the charity on Who Wants to Be a Millionaire?.

Dynevor was appointed Member of the Order of the British Empire (MBE) in the 2021 New Year Honours for services to drama. She collected her medal at a ceremony at Windsor Castle on 2 February 2022.

Filmography

References

External links
 

1963 births
20th-century English actresses
21st-century English actresses
Living people
People from Middleton, Greater Manchester
Alumni of the Mountview Academy of Theatre Arts
English television actresses
English soap opera actresses
Members of the Order of the British Empire